Ballycroy may refer to:

 Ballycroy, Ontario, a community in Adjala-Tosorontio township
 Ballycroy National Park
 Ballycroy, County Mayo, a village in the Republic of Ireland